Commercial may refer to:

 a dose of advertising conveyed through media (such as - for example - radio or television) 
 Radio advertisement
 Television advertisement
 (adjective for:) commerce, a system of voluntary exchange of products and services
 (adjective for:) trade, the trading of something of economic value such as goods, services, information or money
 Two functional constituencies in elections for the Legislative Council of Hong Kong:
Commercial (First)
Commercial (Second)
  Commercial (album), a 2009 album by Los Amigos Invisibles
 Commercial broadcasting
 Commercial style or early Chicago school, an American architectural style
 Commercial Drive, Vancouver, a road in Vancouver, British Columbia, Canada
 Commercial Township, New Jersey, in Cumberland County, New Jersey

See also
 
 Comercial (disambiguation), Spanish and Portuguese word for the same thing
 Commercialism